Antonio Pacheco d'Agosti (born 11 April 1976) is a Uruguayan retired footballer who played as a forward. He also held an Italian passport.

He started his 21-year professional career with Peñarol, appearing in more than 300 official matches for the club. Additionally, he played abroad in Italy, Spain and Argentina.

Club career
Born in Montevideo, Pacheco was signed by Inter Milan in January 2001 after stellar performances at local C.A. Peñarol, with a contract running until 30 June 2005. However, he made only one Serie A appearance with the Italians when he replaced Vladimir Jugovic in the away game at Lazio, and served consecutive loans in the following years, with Peñarol but also in Spain, first with RCD Espanyol then Albacete Balompié, with the latter buying the player permanently afterwards.

In January 2006, as Albacete was now in the second division, Pacheco wanted out, and was eventually loaned to Deportivo Alavés until the end of the season. The move was a disaster individually (no La Liga appearances) and collectively (relegation).

After a brief spell in Argentina with Club de Gimnasia y Esgrima La Plata, Pacheco returned in 2007 for a third stint with Peñarol: he scored 12 Primera División goals in the 2008–09 campaign, including twice in a 2–3 away loss against city rivals Club Nacional de Football on 24 May 2009, one through a penalty kick.

After reaching the 2011 Copa Libertadores final, 35-year-old Pacheco signed with Montevideo Wanderers FC. In June 2012 he returned to his main club Peñarol, retiring three years later at 39 even though he still received offers to continue.

International career
During seven years, Pacheco gathered 12 appearances for Uruguay, scoring three times. His debut came on 12 October 1997, in a 0–0 in Argentina for the 1998 FIFA World Cup qualifiers.

Afterwards, Pacheco was summoned for the final squad at the 1999 Copa América, playing three matches for the eventual runners-up.

Honours

Club
Peñarol
Uruguayan Primera División: 1994, 1995, 1996, 1997, 1999, 2003, 2009–10, 2012–13
Copa Libertadores: Runner-up 2011

International
Uruguay
Copa América: Runner-up 1999

References

External links
 
 Inter Milan profile
 
 
 
 

1976 births
Living people
Uruguayan sportspeople of Italian descent
Footballers from Montevideo
Uruguayan footballers
Association football forwards
Uruguayan Primera División players
Peñarol players
Montevideo Wanderers F.C. players
Serie A players
Inter Milan players
La Liga players
Segunda División players
RCD Espanyol footballers
Albacete Balompié players
Deportivo Alavés players
Argentine Primera División players
Club de Gimnasia y Esgrima La Plata footballers
Uruguay international footballers
1997 FIFA Confederations Cup players
1999 Copa América players
Uruguayan expatriate footballers
Expatriate footballers in Italy
Expatriate footballers in Spain
Expatriate footballers in Argentina
Uruguayan expatriate sportspeople in Italy
Uruguayan expatriate sportspeople in Spain
Uruguayan expatriate sportspeople in Argentina